A New Day in Old Sana'a is a 2005 romantic drama film directed by Bader Ben Hirsi, a British playwright and director of Yemeni ancestry, and produced by Ahmed Abdali. It was shot in San‘a’, the capital of Yemen, and was the first Yemeni film to be shown at the Cannes Film Festival.

The film was advertised as the first film to come out of Yemen.

The running time of the film was 86 minutes, and versions were released in English and Arabic (with English subtitles).

In addition to Cannes, the film was screened at the Cairo International Film Festival; after its showing in Cairo, Hirsi received a prize of £E100,000 from the Egyptian Ministry of Culture.

Plot
The film is shown through the eyes of Federico, a photographer from Italy. Tariq (a friend of Federico) is scheduled to marry Bilquis, the daughter of a rich judge. However, while out in the city one night, he catches sight of a woman he believes to be Bilquis, and falls in love with her. The film ends with a shot of a jinn, played by Hirsi himself.

Cast
Sahar Alasbahi as Amal 
Dania Hammoud as Ines 
Redha Khoder as Bilquis 
Paolo Romano as Federico 
Nabil Saber as Tariq
Bader Ben Hirsi as a djinn

References

External links
British Films Catalogue review of the film
The production company's website
Variety's interview with the director
 

2000s Arabic-language films
2000s English-language films
2005 romantic drama films
Yemeni films
2005 films
2005 multilingual films